Franco Israel Wibmer (born 22 April 2000) is a Uruguayan professional footballer who plays as a goalkeeper for Primeira Liga club Sporting CP.

Club career

Early career
Born in Nueva Helvecia, Israel played basketball and football as child, before opting for the latter, when the games of the two teams he represented began being scheduled at the same day. He started his football career in the youth ranks of local club Artesano, before joining Nacional's youth setup in 2016, moving subsequently to the city of Montevideu, living in a flat alongside his brother.

Having impressed in Nacional's 2018 U-20 Copa Libertadores campaign, which they won, Italian club Juventus decided to sign him on 17 August 2018, on a five-year deal for a transfer worth €2.2 million. He made his professional debut on 28 September 2020 in Juventus U23's 2–1 league win against Pro Sesto. On 24 November, the first team's squad Andrea Pirlo called up Israel for a UEFA Champions League match against Ferencváros; he was eventually called up three other times in the 2020–21 season.

Sporting CP
On 5 July 2022, Israel signed a five-year contract with Portuguese club Sporting CP for a fee of €650,000 for 60% of his economic rights. He made his competitive debut for club, on 4 October, in a Champions League away match against Marseille, where he replaced Marcus Edwards early into first half, after starting goalkeeper Antonio Adán was sent off; he conceded two goals as the match ended in a 4–1 loss. In the reverse fixture a week later, Israel made his first start, featuring in the 2–0 home loss against the same opponent.

International career
Israel is a former Uruguay youth international. He has represented Uruguay at several tournaments including the 2019 South American U-20 Championship and 2019 FIFA U-20 World Cup.

Career statistics

Honours
Nacional U20
U-20 Copa Libertadores: 2018

Uruguay U20
 South American Games silver medal: 2018

References

External links
 
 

2000 births
Living people
People from Nueva Helvecia
Association football goalkeepers
Uruguayan footballers
Uruguay youth international footballers
Uruguay under-20 international footballers
Serie C players
Juventus Next Gen players
Sporting CP footballers
South American Games silver medalists for Uruguay
South American Games medalists in football
Uruguayan expatriate footballers
Uruguayan expatriate sportspeople in Italy
Uruguayan expatriate sportspeople in Portugal
Expatriate footballers in Italy
Expatriate footballers in Portugal

Uruguayan sportspeople of Italian descent